Citlaltépetl (Nahuatl: "star mountain") is a municipality in the Mexican state of Veracruz, located  northwest of the state capital of Xalapa and  south of the city of Tampico, Tamaulipas.

Geography
It borders the municipalities of Ozuluama to the northwest, Tantima to the northeast and east, Tancoco to the southeast, and Chontla to the west.

The majority of the land in Citlaltépetl (65.55%) is pastureland. The dominant soils in the municipality are vertisols and regosols.

Citlaltépetl's climate is warm with rain falling mostly in the summer.

History
In pre-Hispanic times the area was inhabited by the Huastec people, and the Mexica also kept a military presence there. Citlaltépetl was incorporated on 12 June 1872 as a municipality in the canton of Tampico in the state of Veracruz. It became a free municipality on 15 January 1918.

Administration
The municipal government comprises a president, a councillor (Spanish: síndico), and a trustee (regidor). The current president of the municipality is Eutiquia Reyes Santiago.

Demographics
In the 2010 Mexican Census, the municipality of Citlaltépetl recorded a population of 11,081 inhabitants living in 2771 households. The 2015 Intercensal Survey estimated a population of 12,109 inhabitants in Citlaltépetl, 81.85% of whom reported being of Indigenous ancestry and 4.29% reported being of African ancestry. In the 2010 Census, 1955 people or 18% of the population in Citlaltépetl reported speaking an Indigenous language, of which 1887 spoke Nahuatl.

There are 30 localities in the municipality, of which only the municipal seat Citlaltépec is classified as urban. It recorded a population of 5005 inhabitants in the 2010 Census.

Economy
The main economic activity in Citlaltépetl is farming. Corn, coffee and oranges are the main crops grown, and cattle and pigs are raised.

References

Municipalities of Veracruz
1872 establishments in Mexico
States and territories established in 1872